LA-8 is a constituency of Azad Kashmir Legislative Assembly which is currently represented by the Malik Muhammad Nawaz of (All Jammu and Kashmir Muslim Conference). It covers the area of Kotli city in Kotli District of Azad Kashmir, Pakistan.

Election 2016

elections were held in this constituency on 21 July 2016.

References

Kotli District
Government of Azad Kashmir
Azad Kashmir Legislative Assembly constituencies